Edmund Armand Wingo (1895–1964) was a Canadian professional baseball player. He appeared in one game in Major League Baseball for the Philadelphia Athletics during the 1920 season as a catcher.

References

1895 births
1964 deaths
Baseball people from Quebec
Canadian expatriate baseball players in the United States
Major League Baseball catchers
Philadelphia Athletics players
Valleyfield/Cap-de-la-Madeleine Madcaps players
Quebec Bulldogs (baseball) players
Outremont Canadiens players
Ottawa-Hull Senators players
Major League Baseball players from Canada
People from Sainte-Anne-de-Bellevue, Quebec